Eric Royce Zeier (born September 6, 1972) is a former American football quarterback. In his six years in the NFL, he played for the Cleveland Browns (1995), Baltimore Ravens (1996–1998), and the Tampa Bay Buccaneers (1999–2000).  He is a former record-setting quarterback and Heisman Trophy candidate at the University of Georgia, where he set 67 school records and 18 S.E.C. records.  In 1994, he became the most prolific passer in the history of the Southeastern Conference as well as only the third quarterback in NCAA Division I history to throw for more than 11,000 yards in his career. He earned All-Academic S.E.C. honors in 1992 and 1993 and was named UGA Team Captain in 1993 and 1994.

Zeier continues his affiliation with UGA by serving as the color analyst at away games for the University of Georgia Bulldogs radio network and during the Tailgate Show and half time during home games. He currently resides in his hometown of Marietta, Georgia.

Career history

High school
Zeier started his career at Heidelberg American High School in Heidelberg, Germany in the fall of 1988 where he led them to a championship his sophomore year.  He played point guard for the varsity basketball team and short stop for the varsity baseball team as well. His father coached the baseball team and was a colonel in the Army. The family made a strategic move to Marietta, Georgia in 1990 transferring to Marietta High School in Marietta, Georgia. His #15 jersey was retired at the school.

College
After graduating from Marietta, Zeier attended the University of Georgia. Zeier was one of the first notable high school football players to graduate ahead of his class so as to attend his college early and join the football team for spring practices, enrolling in January 1991.  At Georgia, he compiled a 26-14-1 record as a starter. He made his debut as a Bulldog on October 5, 1991 against the Clemson Tigers, a game Georgia won 27-12. Zeier went on to start the final seven games of his freshman season and started every game during his final three seasons at Georgia. His tenure included a 4-0 record against Georgia Tech, a victory in the 1991 Independence Bowl over Arkansas, and a victory in the 1993 Citrus Bowl over Ohio State.

Zeier finished his college career with 67 school records and 18 Southeastern Conference records. He became the SEC's all-time passing leader with 11,153 yards—a record which has been surpassed only by Peyton Manning and UGA's own David Greene and Aaron Murray. In 1993, his junior season, Zeier threw for 544 yards against Southern Miss, a school record. In 1994, Zeier was named the American Football Coaches Association First-team All-American quarterback. Over his four years at Georgia, Zeier completed 877 of 1461 attempts for 11,153 yards, 67 touchdowns, and 37 interceptions.

NFL
Zeier was selected by the Cleveland Browns in the third round of the 1995 NFL Draft.  Over the next six years he went from Cleveland to the Baltimore Ravens to the Tampa Bay Buccaneers and finally back home to the Atlanta Falcons.

Broadcasting
Zeier has returned to the University of Georgia to take over the duty of color analyst on all away games.  He, along with Scott Howard, is taking the place of long time Georgia announcer Larry Munson.  Eric made his first radio start on September 22, 2007 when Georgia played Alabama in which Georgia won in an overtime victory. Eric was heard on the Tailgate Show and halftime during the home games with Loran Smith and Neil "Hondo" Williamson.

See also
 List of Division I FBS passing yardage leaders

References

External links
 Former UGA star to lead health-care network
 Team Doctors Press Release
 Atlanta Business - Lunch with a VIP

1972 births
Living people
American football quarterbacks
Baltimore Ravens players
Cleveland Browns players
Georgia Bulldogs football players
Players of American football from Pensacola, Florida
Tampa Bay Buccaneers players